The Journal of Aging & Social Policy is a peer-reviewed medical and social science journal covering aging and related public policy issues. It currently releases 6 issues per year. It was established in 1989 and is published by Routledge. The editor-in-chief is Edward Alan Miller (University of Massachusetts Boston). According to the Journal Citation Reports, the journal has a 2019 impact factor of 1.444.

References

External links

Gerontology journals
Publications established in 1989
Quarterly journals
English-language journals
Routledge academic journals
Policy analysis journals